Rother Kuppe is a mountain in Bavaria, Germany.

Geography
The mountain is about 1.35 km southwest of the town of Roth, a locality in Hausen, Rhön-Grabfeld.

Geology
It consists primarily of a basalt plate.

Description
It is 711 meters above sea level at its peak.  The northeast flank is covered by forest.  Southwest of the summit is a large meadow with old beech trees, one of which is 7.8 meters in circumference. The tree, however, has suffered greatly from the recent hurricane Kyrill.  

There is also a resort and club built on the summit open all year with a wide panoramic view of the area. 

Mountains of Bavaria
Mountains and hills of the Rhön